The Keystone Cup is the Junior B ice hockey championship and trophy for Western Canada. From 1983 to 2017, the championship was the culmination of the champions of 12 hockey leagues in British Columbia, Alberta, Saskatchewan, Manitoba, and Northwestern Ontario. In 2018, citing costs for travel and accommodations, British Columbia, Alberta and Saskatchewan withdrew from competition for the Keystone Cup, making it a championship between Manitoba and Northwestern Ontario.

There is no national championship for Junior B hockey in Canada, but similar championships are held in Southern Ontario (Sutherland Cup), Ottawa District (Barkley Cup), Quebec (Coupe Dodge), and Atlantic Canada (Don Johnson Memorial Cup)—leaving five teams at the end of each year with a shared claim to being the best Junior B team in Canada.

History
The Keystone Cup was donated to the Canadian Amateur Hockey Association by Keystone Sports from Selkirk, Manitoba. The inaugural tournament took place in 1983 in Portage la Prairie, Manitoba, and was won by the Selkirk Fishermen of the Manitoba Junior B Hockey League.

The championship is determined through a round-robin of the winner of the Cyclone Taylor Cup in British Columbia, the winner of the Russ Barnes Trophy in Alberta, the winner of the Athol Murray Trophy in Saskatchewan, the Keystone Junior Hockey League, and the William Ryan Trophy in Northwestern Ontario.  In previous years, the winner of the Keystone Junior B League would have had to go through the Manitoba Provincial Junior B Hockey Championship, but in 2004 their only competition, the Northwest Junior Hockey League, folded.  The same thing happened in the William Ryan Trophy Championship for the Thunder Bay Junior B League, as their only competition, the North of Superior Junior B Hockey League, folded in 2004.

For the 2018 edition of the tournament in Thunder Bay, Ontario, teams from British Columbia and Alberta pulled out of the event.  NEAJBHL President Ned Graling cited economic concerns while Kamloops Storm general manager Barry Dewar made claims about playing conditions and accommodations in Manitoba and Northwestern Ontario. The Prairie Junior Hockey League followed British Columbia and Alberta and also withdrew from the 2018 Keystone Cup bringing it to a cross-border clash between the Keystone Junior Hockey League and the Lakehead Junior Hockey League, won by the host Northern Hawks.  In mid-November 2019 the teams of the Prairie Junior Hockey League of Saskatchewan decided to send their provincial champion as their representative to the 2020 Keystone Cup. However, the 2020 competition was cancelled as part of the effort to minimize the COVID-19 pandemic.

Keystone Cup 2019
In Peguis First Nation, Manitoba

Round Robin

Championship Round

2019 Roll of Champions
KJHL (Man) — Host Peguis Juniors
KJHL (Man) — KJHL regular season champion Cross Lake Islanders
LJHL (Ont) — LJHL champion Thunder Bay Northern Hawks
LJHL (Ont) — LJHL runner up Thunder Bay Fighting Walleye

Champions

Most Top 3 Finishes by Province (since 1999)

References

External links
Keystone Cup

Ice hockey tournaments in Canada
Canadian ice hockey trophies and awards
Ice hockey in Western Canada